The American rock band Cold has released six studio albums, four extended plays, fourteen singles, fifteen promotional singles and fourteen music videos.

Studio albums

Extended plays

Singles

Music videos

References

Discographies of American artists